The Flow of X is an album by the American jazz pianist Matthew Shipp, recorded in 1995 and released on the 2.13.61 label. It features a quartet with violinist Mat Maneri, bassist William Parker and drummer Whit Dickey, the same lineup as the previous album Critical Mass. The liner notes include a piece by Shipp comparing boxing and jazz.

Reception

In his review for AllMusic, Charlie Wilmoth states that "Shipp plays rich, low-register chords and more acrobatic lines like a slightly more sedate Cecil Taylor." The JazzTimes review by Josef Woodard notes that "this music is all about flow, the flow of dialogue and moods between sentient musicians and the flow of music with a decidedly free will."

Track listing
All compositions by Matthew Shipp
 "Flow of X" – 5:49
 "Flow of Silence" – 6:12
 "Flow of Y" – 7:43
 "Flow of M" – 6:52
 "Flow of U" – 9:33
 "Instinctive Codes" – 12:40

Personnel
Matthew Shipp - piano
Mat Maneri – violin
William Parker – bass
Whit Dickey – drums

References

1997 albums
Matthew Shipp albums
2.13.61 albums